Mary Agnes Moroney (born May 9, 1928) was an American child who was kidnapped from her home in Chicago, Illinois, on May 15, 1930. The case was heavily covered by both local and national media, but her whereabouts have never been officially ascertained. Mary Agnes' kidnapping is the oldest unsolved case of this nature in the files of the Chicago Missing Persons Bureau.

In 2023, it was announced that DNA tests conducted with the participation of Mary Agnes' surviving family had determined that the girl had been taken to Michigan following the kidnapping and was given the name "Jeanette Burchard". She later moved to Florida, where she had died in 2003 at the age of 75.

Disappearance
Mary Agnes Moroney was born in Chicago, Illinois, on May 9, 1928, the first of two daughters to Michael and Catherine Moroney; she had a younger sister named Anastasia, who was eleven months old at the time of the kidnapping. The Moroney family lived in poverty, as Michael only made US$15 per week passing out handbills. A relative of Catherine's wrote to a welfare agency and a paragraph on their plight was printed. The service did not normally disclose addresses but, through a slip, the family's address5200 Wentworth Avenuewas learned by a woman.

On May 14, 1930, Mary Agnes' mother answered a knock at her door and was greeted by a woman who claimed to have been sent by a social worker to deal with the Moroneys' case. She was described as well-dressed, about 22 years of age, with protruding teeth and a "cultured" voice. The woman identified herself as "Julia Otis". After Catherine disclosed the family's many problems, the woman asked if she could temporarily take Mary Agnes to California with her, adding that she would be unrecognisable and "fat as a butterball". Catherine refused. After promising to return, the woman handed Catherine US$2 and left.

The following day the woman came back, this time with baby clothes, as Catherine was pregnant. She stated that she had arranged to get a better job for her husband Michael and offered to take Mary Agnes to a nearby store to buy her some clothes and shoes. Reluctantly, Catherine gave her consent. Later she commented that Mary Agnes sobbed and refused to go with the woman, but was taken anyway. Mary Agnes and the unidentified woman never returned.

Letters

First letter
The Moroney family received a letter from "Julia Otis" the day after she took Mary Agnes. It read:

This was the last the Moroneys ever heard from "Julia Otis".

Second letter
Two weeks after the kidnapping, a woman who identified herself as "Alice Henderson" sent the Moroneys a letter in which she stated that "Otis" was her cousin and that she was "love hungry" because her own husband and baby had died the year before. Henderson never wrote again and authorities state that the letter from "Otis" was written in the same handwriting as the one written by "Henderson".

Alleged findings

Martha Thompson
In July 1931, an elder Native American woman named Martha Thompson was found pushing a cart to join a circus. The cart contained a blond-haired, blue-eyed three-year-old girl that matched Mary Agnes' description. Thompson maintained that the girl was abandoned by her mother, Florence Fuller, and begged to be allowed to keep her. The Moroneys did not identify the girl as Mary Agnes.

Mary McClelland
In 1952, a 24-year-old housewife called Mary McClelland (née Beck) came forward, claiming that, by looking at photos of Mary Agnes' siblings (six more were born after her kidnapping) she suspected she was Mary the missing girl. McClelland had been adopted within a year of the kidnapping by Charles and Nora Beck. Dr. Kraus, after studying and comparing her dental casts, named her as one of the family. McClelland's skull and blood showed she was a Moroney and her mother claimed to recognize her. An aging physician named Dr. E. W. Merrithew, however, stated that he delivered McClelland to an unknown mother on November 17, 1927, and that her mother provided a baby picture of her daughter dating from 1928, which proved she had been adopted two years before the kidnapping. Furthermore, Mary Agnes underwent an operation for a ruptured navel, but McClelland did not have the scar Mary Agnes had at the time of her disappearance. Further DNA testing proved she was not Mary Agnes. She died in 2005. A DNA test performed in 2008, following McClelland's death, conclusively determined that she was not Mary Agnes

2023 developments
In February 2023, it was announced that DNA testing had determined a link between Mary Agnes' surviving family and relatives of Jeanette Bruchard, a Florida resident who had died in 2003 at the age of 75.

See also
List of kidnappings
Lists of people who disappeared

References

External links
Mary Agnes Moroney at the Doe Network

1930s missing person cases
Kidnapped American children
Missing American children
Missing person cases in Illinois
People from Chicago
Incidents of violence against girls